Bohar wala بوھڑ والا is a village in the District Jhang Tehsil Ahmadpur Sial Punjab of Pakistan.Jhang District of Punjab province of Pakistan. The town is located near the River Chenab after the River Jehlam merges with this river.The Village is in center of Garh Maharaja and 18 Hazari about distance to 20KM and The town is located on the Garh Maharaja-18 Hazari Road Road in Jhang Sadar.
The town is well know in area of Jhang.

Villages in Jhang District